Blood Money is a 2012 Indian Hindi-language action thriller film directed by Vishal Mahadkar and produced by Mahesh Bhatt.<ref>|accessdate=30 March 2012|Blood Diamond]] (2006), The Devil's Advocate (1997), The Firm (1993) and to Bhatt's earlier directorial film Naam (1986)</ref> The film stars Kunal Khemu, Amrita Puri and Manish Chaudhari in lead roles with Teeshay Shah and Puja Gupta in other important roles.

Plot
The story is about Kunal Kadam, who believes he can do anything by trying his hardest. He receives a job offer through his best friend Sean Mathews and his wife Nandini in Cape Town and moves there with his wife Aarzoo Kadam. They live a happy life together until Kunal becomes extremely workaholic. Kunal's nature irritates Aarzoo, which leads to frequent outbursts and quarrels. Kunal becomes the most trusted employee of his boss Dharmesh Zaveri (actually Rajan Zakaria). This thing angers Dinesh Zaveri, Dharmesh's younger brother. Kunal advances in his job. Soon Dharmesh is revealed to be an underworld gangster. The company Kunal works in deals with exporting diamonds; Kunal has no idea that it happens illegally. Dharmesh sends his hot colleague Rosa to charm Kunal and takes him away from his wife. Following the day when Kunal gets drunk at a party, Rosa takes advantage and manages to make love with him. Kunal reaches his house and finds Aarzoo sleeping and accidentally wakes her up, after which they both pick up a quarrel. Soon enough, Kunal realizes the crime he is a part of and decides to leave Cape Town. However, Dharmesh knows that Kunal is aware of the illegal business, and the only way to keep him silent is to kill him.

Kunal one day tells Aarzoo that Rosa took advantage of him when he was drunk, which leaves Aarzoo shattered, and she returns him the diamond pendant given to her by him, writing that she can't live with him anymore and has gone to stay at Sean's house. Sean tries to console Kunal, and in the process, it's revealed that even Sean knows about Dharmesh's evil plans but can't do anything in front of him. He advises Kunal not to oppose him; otherwise, he might end up losing his life. Kunal then gets a call from his boss, who sends him to a place where he unknowingly gives a gun and other weapons in exchange for the diamonds, to a terrorist who kills an innocent man in front of him. Kunal feels bad and returns to find that Sean has been killed.

Then, he reveals what wrong had been happening with him and how he wanted to leave this, to Aarzoo who later understands and joins him. Kunal tries to get help from police officer Bobby Kapadia. He asks Kunal to get into Dharmesh's cabin and get his computer's hard disk and a black diary in which he keeps all his records. Kunal manages to get them, but as he is about to go, he is chased by some guards. He gets stabbed by Dinesh but beats him and survives. He fights against all the guards and reaches the plane area, where he gets to know that Bobby was actually working with Dharmesh, whose real name is "Rajan Zakaria" and his plan was to make Kunal reach the plane area where he would kill him. Then Kunal reveals to Dharmesh that it was his plan to make him come to the plane area and that he knew about his identity and thus was playing a game with him. As Dharmesh gets up to hit Kunal, he throws the gun and beats him, till Interpol arrives. Dharmesh is then arrested, and Kunal is taken to safety. Later, it is shown at the end that Kunal and Aarzoo move back to Madh Island, and Kunal is shown reading Hansel and Gretel story to some little kids, and the film ends with a song.

Cast
 Kunal Khemu as Kunal Kadam
 Amrita Puri as Aarzoo Kadam (Kunal's wife)
 Karan Veer Mehra as Inspector Bobby Kapadia (A police officer in Cape Town)
 Manish Chaudhari as Dharmesh Zaveri (Kunal's boss) / Rajan Zakaria (An underworld don)
 Mia Evonne Uyeda as Rosa Cost (Kunal's colleague)
 Sandeep Sikand as Dinesh Zaveri (Dharmesh's younger brother)
 Shekhar Shukla as Paresh Shah (A customer at Trinity Diamonds)
 Teeshay Shah as Sean Mathews (Kunal's colleague and best friend in Cape Town)
 Puja Gupta as Nandini Mathews (Sean's wife and Aarzoo's best friend in Cape Town)

Development
The film was earlier titled Kalyug 2 and was to be a sequel to 2005's Kalyug. Director Vishal Mahadkar did not appreciate the title and changed it to Jannat 2, making it a sequel to the 2008 hit Jannat. When the public's feedback to this title turned out to be even more negative, it was finally renamed to Blood Money.

Reception

CriticalBlood Money received mixed to positive responses, but Kunal Khemu received a positive response from critics. Jeeturaaj of radio mirchi gave it 3.5/5 stars saying "interesting insight into diamond trade and brilliant songs". Martin D'souza of glamsham.com said "There are a few flaws, but I'd rather not dwell on those because the overall impact is massive" awarding it 3/5 stars. Madhureeta Mukherjee of Times of India  rated the film 3/5 and said "Debutant director, (Vishal S Mahadkar), tells the story well".

Sukanya Verma of Rediff.com gave it 1/5 stars and wrote "Blood Money is exceptionally hollow in its aspirations". Writing for FilmiTadka, Janhavi Patel gave the film 2.5 out of 5 stars and said, "Blood Money starts off decently but goes downhill in the second half with a laughable climax. Spend your money elsewhere". Blessy Chettiar of DNA awarded 2 out of 5 stars and said, "Wait for Blood Money's television premier. Or else, watch the trailer. Why waste 2.5 hours on something you can watch in 2.05 minutes?"

Box office
The film had an average opening at the box office. Usually, Vishesh Films' collections are a net gross of about Rs. 250 million: Blood Money collected more than 90 million in its full theatrical run in India, which is a decent amount for the Bhatt's nevertheless it was declared "Average" by Box Office India.

SoundtrackBlood Moneys soundtrack was released on 19 February 2012. It was composed by Jeet Gannguli, Pranay, Sangeet Haldipur, Siddharth Haldipur (Sangeet-Siddharth); lyrics were penned by Sayeed Quadri, Kumaar.

Track list

Reception

The album received positive reviews from critics. Joginder Tuteja from Bollywood Hungama gave the album a 3.5/5 stars picking "Jo Tere Sang", "Gunaah (unplugged)" and "Chaahat" as his favourites. Musicaloud gave the album 3/5 stars picking "Chaahat" and "Gunaah" as their favourites. Times of India'' states that "Blood Money, like all previous Bhatt films, has some great music that will help take the movie to a different level altogether".
 Bollywood Hungama 
 Musicaloud

References

External links

 

2012 films
2010s Hindi-language films
Sony Music India soundtracks
Viacom18 Studios films
Indian action thriller films
Indian crime thriller films
Indian crime action films
2012 action thriller films
Films scored by Jeet Ganguly
Films scored by Siddharth Haldipur
2012 crime action films
2012 crime thriller films